Rear Admiral Robin Ivor Trower Hogg CB FRSA (born 25 September 1932) is a former senior Royal Navy officer.

Naval career
Born on 25 September 1932 and educated at Bedford School, Robin Trower Hogg was Director of Naval Operational Requirements for the Royal Navy between 1982 and 1984, Flag Officer First Flotilla between 1984 and 1986, and Chief of Staff to the Commander-in-Chief Fleet between 1986 and 1987.

Rear Admiral Robin Trower Hogg was invested as a Companion of the Order of the Bath in the 1988 New Year Honours.

References

1932 births
Living people
People educated at Bedford School
Royal Navy rear admirals
Companions of the Order of the Bath